Fernhill Park may refer to:

Fernhill Park (Berkshire)
Fernhill Park (Oregon)